Japonia is a genus of land snails with opercula, terrestrial gastropods in the subfamily Cyclophorinae of the family Cyclophoridae. 

The genus was created by Augustus Addison Gould in 1959.

Species
The genus Japonia includes the following species:
 
 Japonia alticola (Laidlaw, 1937)
 Japonia anceps Vermeulen, Liew & Schilthuizen, 2015
 Japonia balabacensis (E. A. Smith, 1895)
 Japonia bauensis Marzuki, T. S. Liew & Mohd-Azlan, 2021
 Japonia borneensis (E. A. Smith, 1893)
 Japonia buehleri Forcart, 1936
 Japonia bunguranensis (E. A. Smith, 1894)
 Japonia celebensis (P. Sarasin & F. Sarasin, 1899)
 Japonia changi C.-C. Hwang, 2015
 Japonia ciliocincta (Martens, 1865)
 Japonia citharella (Gould, 1859)
 Japonia clathrata (Heude, 1885)
 Japonia concolor (Möllendorff, 1893)
 Japonia crossei (Morlet, 1886)
 Japonia dido (Godwin-Austen, 1889)
 Japonia ditropis Vermeulen & Junau, 2007
 Japonia duplifolia C.-C. Hwang, 2015
 Japonia fallax B. Rensch, 1931
 Japonia formosana Pilsbry & Hirase, 1905
 Japonia gouldi Kobelt, 1902
 Japonia gradata (Möllendorff, 1894)
 Japonia hagenmulleri (J. Mabille, 1887)
 Japonia heteroveina C.-C. Hwang, 2015
 Japonia hispida Minato, 1982
 Japonia hyalina Vermeulen & Junau, 2007
 Japonia inornata (E. A. Smith, 1893)
 Japonia inouei Kuroda & Habe, 1961
 Japonia janus Vermeulen & Liew, 2022
 Japonia johnabbasi Thach, 2021
 Japonia jucunda (E. A. Smith, 1893)
 Japonia junipervallis C.-C. Hwang, 2015
 Japonia katorii Minato, 1985
 Japonia keppeli (Godwin-Austen, 1889)
 Japonia lanyuensis Y.-C. Lee & W.-L. Wu, 2001
 Japonia mariei (Morlet, 1886)
 Japonia mendicans (J. Mabille, 1887)
 Japonia metcalfei (Issel, 1874)
 Japonia monggisensis Vermeulen & Liew, 2022
 Japonia mucronata (Möllendorff, 1888)
 Japonia mundyana (Godwin-Austen, 1889)
 Japonia musiva (Gould, 1859)
 Japonia pngsiar C.-C. Hwang, 2015
 Japonia quinquelirata (Möllendorff, 1887)
 Japonia rabongensis (E. A. Smith, 1895)
 Japonia sadoensis Pilsbry & Y. Hirase, 1903
 Japonia saetigera (van Benthem Jutting, 195)
 Japonia shigetai Minato, 1985
 Japonia striatula Kuroda, 1973
 Japonia subcarinata (Möllendorff, 1887)
 Japonia subconica (L. Pfeiffer, 1859)
 Japonia subrudis Vermeulen & Liew, 2022
 Japonia tadai C.-C. Hwang, 2015
 Japonia tambunanensis Vermeulen & Liew, 2022
 Japonia tenuipilis (Gredler, 1887)
 Japonia thuthaoae Thach, 2021
 Japonia tokunoshimana Pilsbry & Y. Hirase, 1904
 Japonia trilirata (L. Pfeiffer, 1852)
 Japonia trochulus (Martens, 1867)
 Japonia wallacei (L. Pfeiffer, 1857)

References

 Uchida, R.; Yahya, B. E.; Ahmad, A. H.; Sapaat, A.; Tomiyama, K. (2013). Land Snail Fauna of Sabah, Borneo, Malaysia. Venus (Journal of the Malacological Society of Japan). 71 (1–2): 49–59.

External links
 Nomenclator Zoologicus info
 Gould, A. A. (1859). [Descriptions of shells collected by the North Pacific Exploring Expedition. Proceedings of the Boston Society of Natural History. 6: 422–426]

Cyclophoridae
Taxa named by Augustus Addison Gould